The High Commissioner of the United Kingdom to Sierra Leone is the United Kingdom's foremost diplomatic representative in the Republic of Sierra Leone.

Sierra Leone gained independence from the United Kingdom in 1961. As both countries are members of the Commonwealth of Nations, they exchange High Commissioners rather than ambassadors.

List of heads of mission

High Commissioners
1961–1963: John Johnston
1963–1966: Desmond Crawley
1966–1969: Stanley Fingland
1969–1972: Stephen Olver
1972–1976: Ian Watt
1976–1977: David Roberts
1977–1981: Michael Morgan
1981–1984: Terence Daniel O'Leary
1984–1986: Richard Clift
1986–1991: Derek Partridge
1991–1993: David Sprague
1993–1997: Ian McCluney
1997–2000: Peter Penfold
2000–2003: Alan Jones
2003–2006: John Mitchiner
2006–2008: Sarah MacIntosh
2009–2013: Ian Hughes
2013–2016: Peter West

2016–2019: Guy Warrington
 September 2019–present: Simon Mustard

References

External links
UK and Sierra Leone, gov.uk

Sierra Leone
 
United Kingdom